Dilbert's Desktop Games is a collection of Dilbert-related games for Microsoft Windows.

List of games
Can-O-Matic 2
Fire employees out of a cannon at various gadgets, some of which malfunction badly.

Elbonian Airlines
Similar to Can-O-Matic; managers are fired from a large slingshot and must land on various cities and modes of transportation.

Boss Evaders
A Space Invaders take-off; Dilbert must avoid the pink slips shot at him by fleets of descending managers while attempting to hit them with reports.

Project Pass-Off
A game similar to air hockey; Dilbert must face off against Zimbu the monkey in an attempt to gather good items thrown by a boss, while fending off bad ones.

Enduring Fools
Shock and hurt people saying inane things with a phaser borrowed from Dogbert.

CEO Simulator
Take the role of a CEO in charge of a business, hiring/firing/motivating employees to help the company grow.

Techno Raiders
The main game of the collection. Dilbert must search for gadgets and donuts and work his way from floor to floor in the office building, all the while trying to avoid or hurt co-workers.

The Jargonator
Allows the user to input an amount of text and have it padded with adjectives and jargon in an attempt to make the piece look smarter.

The Final Word
Allows the user to stamp assorted business phrases onto the screen and save the result as a desktop background.

Intrusive Mode
Causes various characters to wander around the screen and speak lines from the comic strip.

Each of the first seven games awards a component when completed, such as a microchip, capacitor, or piece of wire. Once every component has been found, the player can enter his/her name on a printable certificate award that lists the total amount of time spent playing the games.

Reception
In Spain, Sergio Zazo of the magazine PC Manía gave Dilbert's Desktop Games a score of 81 out of 100. He wrote that it provided "great moments of fun".

References

Dilbert
1997 video games
Minigame compilations
Puzzle video games
Windows games
Windows-only games
Video games based on comics
DreamWorks Interactive games
Video games developed in the United States